Hylurgops is a genus of beetles belonging to the family Curculionidae. The species of this genus are found in Eurasia and North America.

Species
The following species are recognised in the genus Hylurgops:

 Hylurgops alternans Wood & Bright, 1992
 Hylurgops batnensis Wood & Bright, 1992
 Hylurgops bonvouloiri Wood & Bright, 1992
 Hylurgops corpulentus Schedl, 1947
 Hylurgops dubius Schedl, 1947
 Hylurgops electrinus Wood & Bright, 1992
 Hylurgops eusulcatus Tsai & Huang, 1964
 Hylurgops flohri Eggers, 1930
 Hylurgops fushunensis Murayama, 1940
 Hylurgops glabratus Wood & Bright, 1992
 Hylurgops grandicollis J.M.Swaine, 1917
 Hylurgops granulatus Wood & Bright, 1992
 Hylurgops imitator Reitter, 1913
 Hylurgops incomptus Wood & Bright, 1992
 Hylurgops inouyei Nobuchi, 1959
 Hylurgops interstitialis Wood & Bright, 1992
 Hylurgops junnanicus B.V.Sokanovskii, 1959
 Hylurgops knausi J.M.Swaine, 1917
 Hylurgops lecontei J.M.Swaine, 1917
 Hylurgops likiangensis Tsai & Huang, 1964b
 Hylurgops longipennis Wood & Bright, 1992
 Hylurgops longipilus Wood & Bright, 1992
 Hylurgops major Eggers, 1944
 Hylurgops modestus Murayama, 1937
 Hylurgops niponicus Murayama, 1936
 Hylurgops palliatus Wood & Bright, 1992
 Hylurgops parvus Eggers
 Hylurgops piger H.F.Wickham, 1913
 Hylurgops pilosellus Schedl, 1947
 Hylurgops pinifex Wood & Bright, 1992
 Hylurgops planirostris Wood & Bright, 1992
 Hylurgops porosus Wood & Bright, 1992
 Hylurgops reticulatus Wood, 1972
 Hylurgops rugipennis (Mannerheim, 1843)
 Hylurgops schellwieni Schedl, 1947
 Hylurgops spessivtsevi Eggers, 1914
 Hylurgops squamosus Murayama, 1942
 Hylurgops starki Eggers
 Hylurgops sulcatus Eggers, 1933
 Hylurgops transbaicalicus Eggers, 1941
 Hylurgops tuberculatus Schedl, 1947
 Hylurgops tuberculifer Wood, 1988

References

Curculionidae
Curculionidae genera